Anubias gilletii is a plant that was first described scientifically in 1901 by Émile Auguste Joseph De Wildeman and Th. Durand.

Distribution
Nigeria, Cameroon, Gabon, Republic of the Congo, and Democratic Republic of the Congo.

Description
Its long-stalked medium-green leaves are spear-shaped and may grow to about 40 cm in length. It grows in muddy areas near, or in streams, sometimes even completely submerged.

Cultivation
This plant grows best when only partially submersed and when not crowded by other plants. It requires a lot of nutrients, a loose, iron-rich substrate, and moderate-to-strong light. It prefers a temperature range of 22-26 degrees C (72-79 degrees F). It can be propagated by dividing the rhizome or by its seed.

References

gilletii
Aquatic plants
Flora of Nigeria
Flora of West-Central Tropical Africa
Plants described in 1901
Taxa named by Émile Auguste Joseph De Wildeman
Taxa named by Théophile Alexis Durand